Apache Blood is a 1973 American Western film starring Ray Danton. The direction is credited to Thomas Quillen.

The film was originally released as A Man Called She  and is also known by its 1975 reissue title,  Pursuit.

Plot summary
In 1860s Arizona, a peace treaty had been established between Mescalero Apaches and the U.S. government. In 1866, however, a U.S. Cavalry troupe massacred an Apache tribe, leaving only a few survivors, including a warrior named Yellow Shirt. Yellow Shirt seeks vengeance by pursuing injured cavalry officer Sam Glass.

Production notes
The film was shot in Arizona in 1971 under the working title Sh'e ee Clit Soak ("The Man Who Wore the Yellow Shirt" in an Apache language, according to the film's opening narration).
It is the only known directorial film credit for Thomas Quillen. Although some sources have stated  this may have been a pseudonym for the film's producer, Vern Piehl, contemporary newspaper reports indicate that Quillen was a known stage director associated with the Arizona Repertory Theater and the Phoenix Musical Theater Guild.

Reception
No major newspaper is known to have reviewed the film at the time of its release. In his book Western Movies, Michael R. Pitts dismissed the film as a "tatty low-budget effort".

Cast 
Ray Danton as Yellow Shirt
Dewitt Lee as Sam Glass
Troy Nabors as Cpl. Lem Hawkins
Diane Taylor as Yellow Shirt's Woman
Eva Kovacs as Martha Glass
Jason Clark as Army Dispatch Rider
Dave Robart as Soldier
William Chatwick as Soldier
Carl Mancini as Soldier
Earl Baldwin as Soldier
Wilford 'Whizzer' White as Indian
Carl Nelson as Indian
Jack Lee as Soldier at Fort

See also
 List of American films of 1973

References

External links

 
 

1973 films
1973 Western (genre) films
1970s English-language films
American Western (genre) films
Films set in the 1860s
Films set in Arizona
Films shot in Arizona
Films about Native Americans
American films about revenge
1970s American films